The Creighton Lecture is an annual lecture delivered at King's College, London on a topic in history.  The series, which memorializes historian and prelate Mandell Creighton, began in 1907 with a grant of £650, half of which was donated by his widow, Louise Creighton.

List of Creighton Lectures
1907 Thomas Hodgkin, The Wardens of the Northern Marches (published 1908)
1908 G. W. Prothero, ‘The arrival of Napoleon III’ [unpublished]
1909 J. B. Bury, The Constitution of the Later Roman Empire (published 1910)
1910 F. J. Haverfield, ‘Greek and Roman town-planning’; expanded into his Ancient Town-Planning (1913)
1911 H. A. L. Fisher, Political Unions (published 1911)
1912 Paul Vinogradoff, ‘Constitutional history and the year books’, Law Quarterly Review, xxix (1913), 273–84
1913  R. B. Haldane, The Meaning of Truth in History (published 1914)
1914 James Bryce, Race Sentiment as a Factor in History (published 1915)
1915 J. W. Fortescue, ‘England at war in three centuries’ [unpublished?]
1916 A. F. Pollard, ‘The growth of an imperial parliament’, History, i (1916–17), 129–46
1917 C. H. Firth, Then and Now, or a Comparison between the War with Napoleon and the Present War (published 1917)
1918 Gilbert Murray, Aristophanes and the War Party: a Study in the Contemporary Criticism of the Peloponnesian War (published 1919)
1919 G. M. Trevelyan, The War and the European Revolution in Relation to History (published 1920)
1920 T. F. Tout, ‘England and France in the 14th century and now’; expanded into his France and England: their Relations in the Middle Ages and Now (1922)
1921 Julian Corbett, ‘Napoleon and the British Navy after Trafalgar’, Quarterly Review, ccxxxvii (1922), 238–55
1922 Charles Oman, ‘Historical perspective’; cf. his On the Writing of History (1939), pp. 76ff.
1923 G. P. Gooch, Franco-German Relations, 1867–1914 (published 1923)
1924 W. S. Holdsworth, The Influence of the Legal Profession on the Growth of the English Constitution (published 1924)
1925 Graham Wallas, ‘Bentham as political inventor’, Contemporary Review, cxxix (1926), 308–19
1926 C. W. Alvord, ‘The significance of the new interpretation of Georgian politics’ [unpublished?]
1927 C. Grant Robertson, History and Citizenship (published 1928)
1928 R. W. Seton-Watson, ‘A plea for the study of contemporary history’, History, xiv (1929–30), 1–18
1929 ‘E. Barber’ [?= Ernest Barker], ‘Political ideas in Boston during the American Revolution’ [unpublished?]
1930 Henri Pirenne, ‘La révolution belge de 1830’ [unpublished]
1931 Edward Jenks, ‘History and the historical novel’, The Hibbert Journal, Jan. 1932
1932 F. M. Powicke, ‘Pope Boniface VIII’, History, xviii (1933–4), 307–29
1933 N. H. Baynes, ‘The Byzantine imperial ideal’ [unpublished?]
1934 A. P. Newton, ‘The West Indies in international politics, 1550–1850’, History, xix (1934–5), 193–207, 302–10
1935 F. M. Stenton, ‘The road system of medieval England’, Economic History Review, vii (1936–7), 1–21
1936 Charles Peers, ‘History in the making’, History, xxi (1936–7), 302–16
1937 R. H. Tawney, ‘The economic advance of the squirearchy in the two generations before the civil war’; cf. his ‘Rise of the gentry, 1558–1640’, Economic History Review, xi (1941), 1–38
1938 J. H. Clapham, ‘Charles Louis, Elector Palatine, 1617–80: an early experiment in liberalism’, Economica, new ser., vii (1940), 381–96
1939–45 No lectures
1946 C. K. Webster, ‘The making of the charter of the United Nations’, History, xxxii (1947), 16–38
1947 A. Toynbee, ‘The unification of the world and the change in historical perspective’, History, xxxiii (1948), 1–28
1948 G. N. Clark, The Cycle of War and Peace in Modern History (published 1949)
1949 V. H. Galbraith, Historical Research in Medieval England (published 1951)
1950 J. E. Neale, The Elizabethan Age (published 1951)
1951 E. F. Jacob, Henry Chichele and the Ecclesiastical Politics of his Age (published 1952)
1952 Lewis Namier, Basic Factors in 19th-Century European History (published 1953)
1953 T. F. T. Plucknett, The Mediaeval Bailiff (published 1954)
1954 H. Hale Bellot, Woodrow Wilson (published 1955)
1955 Keith Hancock, The Smuts Papers (published 1956)
1956 M. D. Knowles, Cardinal Gasquet as an Historian (published 1957)
1957 J. G. Edwards, The Commons in Medieval English Parliaments (published 1958)
1958 Lucy S. Sutherland, The City of London and the Opposition to Government, 1768–74: a Study in the Rise of Metropolitan Radicalism (published 1959)
1959 Steven Runciman, The Families of Outremer: the Feudal Nobility of the Crusader Kingdom of Jerusalem, 1099–1291 (published 1960)
1960 Lillian Penson, Foreign Affairs under the Third Marquis of Salisbury (published 1962)
1961 Herbert Butterfield, Charles James Fox and Napoleon: the Peace Negotiations of 1806 (published 1962)
1962 R. R. Darlington, The Norman Conquest (published 1963)
1963 Ronald Syme, ‘Caesar: drama, legend, personality’ [unpublished?]
1964 R. A. Humphreys, Tradition and Revolt in Latin America (published 1965)
1965 Michael Roberts, On Aristocratic Constitutionalism in Swedish History, 1520–1720 (published 1966)
1966 R. W. Southern, ‘England and the continent in the twelfth century’; cf. his Medieval Humanism and Other Studies (1970), pp. 135–57
1967 A. H. M. Jones, ‘The caste system in the later Roman empire’ [unpublished?]
1968 W. N. Medlicott, Britain and Germany: the Search for Agreement, 1930–7 (published 1969)
1969 E. H. Gombrich, Myth and Reality in German War-time Broadcasts (published 1970)
1970 Philip Grierson, The Origins of Money (published 1977)
1971 Isaiah Berlin, ‘Georges Sorel [Harbinger of the Storm]’, in Essays in Honour of E. H. Carr, ed. C. Abramsky (1974), pp. 3–35
1972 C. H. Philips, The Young Wellington in India (published 1973)
1973 A. J. P. Taylor, The Second World War (published 1974)
1974 F. J. Fisher, ‘Labour in the economy of Stuart England’ [unpublished]
1975 Owen Chadwick, Acton and Gladstone (published 1976)
1976 A. Blunt, ‘Illusionism in Baroque architecture’ [unpublished?]
1977 M. M. Postan, ‘The English rural labourer in the later middle ages’ [unpublished]
1978 Joel Hurstfield, The Illusion of Power in Tudor Politics (published 1979)
1979 Joseph Needham, The Guns of Kaifêng-fu: China's Development of Man's First Chemical Explosive (published 1979)
1980 A. Momigliano, ‘The origins of universal history’, Annali della Scuola Normale Superiore di Pisa, ser. 3, xii (1982), 533–60
1981 Michael Howard, The Causes of Wars (published 1981)
1982 Ragnhild M. Hatton, The Anglo-Hanoverian Connection, 1714–60 (published 1983)
1983 Keith Thomas, The Perception of the Past in Early Modern England (published 1983)
1984 William G. Beasley, The Nature of Japanese Imperialism (published 1985)
1985 M. H. Keen, Some Late Medieval Views on Nobility (published 1985)
1986 J. H. Burns, Absolutism: the History of an Idea (published 1986)
1987 E. H. Kossmann, 1787: the Collapse of the Patriot Movement and the Problem of Dutch Decline (published 1988)
1988 H. R. Loyn, The ‘Matter of Britain’: a Historian's Perspective (published 1989)
1989 D. C. Coleman, Myth, History and the Industrial Revolution (published 1989)
1990 Douglas Johnson, ‘Occupation and collaboration: the conscience of France’ [unpublished?]
1991 J. H. Elliott, Illusion and Disillusionment: Spain and the Indies (published 1992)
1992 Ian Nish, The Uncertainties of Isolation: Japan between the Wars (published 1993)
1993 E. J. Hobsbawm, The Present as History: Writing the History of One's Own Times (published 1993)
1994 P. J. Marshall, Imperial Britain (published 1994)
1995 James Campbell, ‘European economic development in the eleventh century: an English case-study’ [unpublished?]
1996 Averil Cameron, ‘Byzantium: why do we need it?’ [unpublished?]
1997 E. Le Roy Ladurie, ‘The History of the book in France, 1460–1970’ [unpublished?]
1998 Peter Clarke, ‘The rise and fall of Thatcherism’, Historical Research, lxxii (1999), 301–22
1999 John Gillingham, ‘Civilizing the English? The English histories of William of Malmesbury and David Hume’, Historical Research, lxxiv (2001), 17–43
2000 Jessica Rawson, ‘The power of images: the model universe of the First Emperor and its legacy’, Historical Research, lxxv (2002), 123–54
2001 Shula Marks, ‘Class, culture and consciousness: the experience of Black South Africans, c.1870–1920’ [unpublished?]
2002 Patrick Collinson, ‘Elizabeth I and the verdicts of history’, Historical Research, lxxvi (2003), 469–91
2003 J. G. A. Pocock, ‘The politics of historiography’, Historical Research, lxxviii (2005), 1–14
2004 R. I. Moore, ‘The war against heresy in medieval Europe’, Historical Research, lxxxi (2008), 189–210
2005 R. F. Foster, ‘Changed Utterly’? Transformation and continuity in late 20th-century Ireland’, Historical Research, lxxx (2007), 419–41
2006 Olwen Hufton, ‘Faith, hope and money: the Jesuits and the genesis of educational fundraising, 1550–1650’ (Historical Research, lxxxi (2008), 585–609)
2007 R. J. W. Evans, 'The Creighton century: British historians and Europe, 1907–2007'|(Historical Research, lxxxii (2009), 320–329)
2008 Chris Wickham, 'Medieval Assembly : The culture of the public: Assembly politics and the 'feudal revolution''.
2009 Robert Service,  'Russia since 1917 in Western mirrors'.
2010 Tim Blanning, 'The Holy Roman Empire of the German Nation past and present'.
2011 Catherine Hall, 'Macaulay and Son: an imperial story'.
2012 Quentin Skinner, 'John Milton as a theorist of liberty'.
2013 Lisa Jardine, 'Meeting my own history coming back : Jacob Bronowski's MI5 files'.
2014 Richard J. Evans, 'Was the 'Final Solution' Unique? Reflections on Twentieth-Century Genocides'.
2015 Margaret MacMillan, 'The Outbreak of the First World War: Why the debate goes on'.

See also
Dixie Professor of Ecclesiastical History
Merton College, Oxford
Bishop of London

Notes

References

British lecture series
History education
King's College London